Laura Molina may refer to:

 Laura Molina (artist) (born 1957), Mexican-American artist, musician, and actress
 Laura Molina (beach volleyball) (born 1986), beach volleyball player from El Salvador
 Laura Molina (badminton), badminton player from Spain